The 1987 Donnay Indoor Championships was a men's tennis tournament played on indoor carpet courts at the Forest National in Brussels, Belgium the event was part of the 1987 Nabisco Grand Prix. It was the seventh edition of the tournament and was held from 23 March until 29 March 1987. Second-seeded Mats Wilander won the singles title.

Finals

Singles

 Mats Wilander defeated  John McEnroe, 6–3, 6–4
 It was Wilander's 2nd singles title of the year and the 22nd of his career.

Doubles

 Boris Becker /  Slobodan Živojinović defeated  Chip Hooper /  Mike Leach, 7–6, 7–6

References

Donnay Indoor Championships
Donnay
+